Karen Persyn (born 31 March 1983) is an alpine skier from Belgium.  She competed for Belgium at the 2010 Winter Olympics.  She finished in 27th place in the slalom, her only event of the competition.

She won her first FIS slalom at Diavolezza, Switzerland on 15 November 2011.

References

External links
 
 
 

1983 births
Living people
Belgian female alpine skiers
Olympic alpine skiers of Belgium
Alpine skiers at the 2010 Winter Olympics